Sacramento is one of the 38 municipalities of Coahuila, in north-eastern Mexico. The municipal seat lies at Sacramento. The municipality covers an area of 168.9 km².

As of 2005, the municipality had a total population of 2,063.

References

Municipalities of Coahuila